Economics of extraterrestrial resource extraction may refer to:

Asteroid mining#Economics 
Colonization of the Moon#Economic prospecting and development 
Colonization of Mars#Economics

Spaceflight economics